Audley Travel is a tour operator based in the UK in Witney, Oxfordshire, with offices in London and Boston. The company covers over 90 destinations worldwide, providing tailor-made travel. According to the Financial Times, Audley is the largest operator in this market.

History 
Audley Travel was founded in a Northampton post office in 1996 by Craig Burkinshaw and John Brewer, both graduates of the London School of Economics. The pair originally offered tours of Vietnam, advertising in The Sunday Times.

In 2006, the company moved to its current headquarters at New Mill in Witney, Oxfordshire, and tourism executive Ian Simkins joined the company as CEO in 2011.

In 2014, the company opened an office in London and a US office in Boston, Massachusetts after it discovered 20% of its web traffic was coming from the United States.

Audley arranges holidays in more than 90 destinations, covering all seven continents. Top-selling destinations include the USA, Canada, Japan, South Africa, India, Australia, New Zealand, Thailand, Vietnam and Costa Rica.

In 2012, equity firm Equistone Partners Europe invested a majority stake in Audley Travel during a management buyout. Equistone exited its investment in 2015, selling its share of the company to private equity firm 3i.

Awards 
Awards won by Audley Travel include:

 Guardian and Observer Travel Awards 2006: Best Tour Operator (Mainstream)
 The Sunday Times 100 Best Small Companies to Work For 2006-2018
 Telegraph Green Travel Awards 2007: Luxury Tour Operator of the Year
 Guardian and Observer Travel Awards 2008: Best Tour Operator (Small)
 Conde Nast Traveler Readers' Travel Awards: First Place Specialist Tour Operator 2010
 Sunday Times Travel Magazine Value For Money Award 2010
 Wanderlust Travel Awards 2011: Best Website
 Wanderlust Travel Awards 2012, 2019 and 2022: Top Tour Operator
 Telegraph Travel Awards 2013: Best Tour Operator
 Guardian and Observer Travel Awards 2014: Best Tour Operator (Small)
 The Oxfordshire Business Awards 2014: Employer of the Year
 The Times and Sunday Times Travel Awards 2016 and 2019: Best Luxury Tour Operator
 Telegraph Travel Awards 2016, 2017 and 2019: Best Tour Operator
 Sunday Times Travel Magazine Value For Money Award: 2018
 Travel Media Awards 2019 and 2020: Best Customer Magazine 
 The Sunday Times Travel Magazine Best Travel Specialists 2020
 Which? Recommended Provider for Escorted Tours: 2021
 Condé Nast Traveler Readers' Choice Awards 2020: Top Tour Operator
 Which? Best Recommended Independent Holiday Provider: 2022
 WTM Global Responsible Tourism Awards - Silver Award 2022

Charity and philanthropy 
In January 2020, Audley was granted Travelife Partner status in recognition of its efforts to improve sustainability and corporate social responsibility. Travelife is the leading international sustainability certification in the travel sector.

In 2021, Audley introduced an Environmental, Social and Corporate Governance (ESG) framework that identifies five areas they will focus on each year. These goals are often aligned to the UN Sustainable Development Goals.

The company created the Audley Travel for Good Fund to support several social and environmental charities around the world that align with its responsible travel approach. As of 2022, the company supports seven UN Sustainable Development Goals focused on supporting the communities and ecosystems clients and staff travel to.

References

Travel and holiday companies of the United Kingdom
Companies based in Oxfordshire